Bogolyubovo is a rural locality (a village) in Kochyovskoye Rural Settlement, Kochyovsky District, Perm Krai, Russia. The population was 1 as of 2010. There is 1 street.

Geography 
Bogolyubovo is located 30 km southeast of Kochyovo (the district's administrative centre) by road. Salnikovo is the nearest rural locality.

References 

Rural localities in Kochyovsky District